Ben et Thomas is a French TV series created by Mike Horelick and Jon Carnoy that first aired on  May 31, 2008 on France 4.

Synopsis
Ben Rosenberg and Thomas Verne are two high school friends into skateboarding. One is a geek, the other is more down-to-earth, but they make a great pair. Though their friendship is tested when Liselott, a beautiful blond-haired person, arrives at school.

The series revolves around these teenagers and their family, school, and love life.

Cast
 Anthony Marocco : Ben Rosenberg
 Amezienne Rehaz : Thomas Verne
 Daphnée Chollet : Martine
 Jemima West : Liselott Karlsson
 Tony Notot : Cotard
 Pauline Prévost : Sandrine Broussard
 Samy Gharbi : Jean Verne
 Bénédicte Roy : Claire
 Pascal Decolland : Roland
 Victoria Monfort : Anne
 Diane Landrot : Mathilde
 Brigitte Sy : Madame Bouillon

Episodes

Season 1 (2008)

Trivia
 Victoria Monfort, who appears in episode 7, is the daughter of famous French sportscaster Nelson Monfort.
 Young actor Azdine Keloua was replaced by Amezienne Rehaz as Thomas Verne at the last minute.
 The creators of the series, Mike Horelick and Jon Carnoy, are both skateboard fans and are the basis for the characters.
 The series is inspired by the feature Pee Stains and Other Disasters.

2008 French television series debuts
2000s TV shows in France
France Télévisions television dramas
France Télévisions television comedy
2000s teen drama television series
Television series about teenagers